The 1926 North Dakota Agricultural Bison football team was an American football team that represented North Dakota Agricultural College (now known as North Dakota State University) in the North Central Conference (NCC) during the 1926 college football season. In its second season under head coach Ion Cortright, the team compiled a 5–3 record (2–3 against NCC opponents) and finished in sixth place out of eight teams in the NCC. The team played its home games at Dacotah Field in Fargo, North Dakota.

Schedule

References

North Dakota Agricultural
North Dakota State Bison football seasons
North Dakota Agricultural Bison football